Manfred Kridl (1882–1957) was a Polish historian of literature.

From 1932 Kridl taught at Wilno's Stefan Batory University, where he was an opponent of anti-semitic ghetto-bench policy. In 1940, during World War II, Kridl managed to escape from occupied Poland and settled in the United States. There he taught at Smith College, then at Columbia University.

Works
Antagonizm wieszczów. Rzecz o stosunku Słowackiego do Mickiewicza, 1925
Literatura polska w. XIX, 1925
Główne prądy literatury europejskie. Klasycyzm, romantyzm, epoka poromantyczna, 1931
Wstęp do badań nad dziełem literackim, 1936
Literatura Polska, 1945
Editor, For Your Freedom and Ours (the democratic heritage of Poland)
A Survey of Polish Literature and Culture, 1956
A. Mickiewicz – Poet of Poland (with other authors)
 The lyric poems of Juliusz Slowacki (Musagetes; contributions to the history of Slavic literature and culture)

See also
List of Poles

1882 births
1957 deaths
Polish emigrants to the United States
20th-century Polish historians
Polish male non-fiction writers
Columbia University faculty
Smith College faculty
Academic staff of Vilnius University